Leende guldbruna ögon is a TV miniseries, originally airing over SVT1 for three Monday evenings in a row between 26 February-12 March 2007 (with reruns airing in November 2008) It was directed by Anna Hylander and Emiliano Goessens with screenplay by Anders Weidemann. The series has an anti-racism dansband theme, and features a lot of dansband music. Even Christer Sjögren and Tomas Ledin appear, playing themselves. On 26 February 2007, the soundtrack album was released.

The series was partly recorded in Rågsved in southern Stockholm.

Plot
23 years old Lennart Johansson from Fellingsbro has dark skin, and wants to become a dansband star. His favourite singer is Christer Sjögren. He wants to sing with dansband Sven Bodins, but is rejected because of his colour of skin. Sven Bodins state there is too much racial prejudice within the dansband genre, even if they declare themselves not having anything against people with dark skin. This leads to Lennart Johansson deciding to start an own band.

References

External links
 Information at IMDB 

2007 Swedish television series debuts
2007 Swedish television series endings
Dansband music
Sveriges Television original programming
Stockholm in fiction
Swedish television miniseries
Television shows set in Stockholm
Västmanland in fiction
2000s television miniseries
Swedish-language television shows